Pranas Giedrimas was a Lithuanian sport shooter.

In 1937 he won silver at 25 m rapid fire pistol individual and team events. In 1939 he won another silver in team event.

References 
ISSF Profile

Lithuanian male sport shooters
Year of birth missing
Place of birth missing
Possibly living people